Griffith Public Schools is a school district in Lake County, Indiana.

External links
 

School districts in Indiana
Education in Lake County, Indiana
1907 establishments in Indiana
School districts established in 1907